Nachusa Township is located in Lee County, Illinois. As of the 2010 census, its population was 493 and it contained 204 housing units. Nachusa Township was formed from China Township on February 8, 1872.

Geography 

Demographics

References

External links 
US Census
City-data.com
Cook County Official Site
Illinois State Archives

Townships in Lee County, Illinois
1872 establishments in Illinois
Townships in Illinois